Homeyreh or Hamireh may refer to:

 Hamireh, Khuzestan
 Homeyreh, Razavi Khorasan